The 1997 Tournament of the Americas, later known as the FIBA Americas Championship and the FIBA AmeriCup, was a basketball championship hosted by Uruguay from 21 to 31, August 1997. The games were played in Montevideo. This FIBA AmeriCup was to earn the four berths allocated to the Americas for the 1998 FIBA World Championship in Athens, Greece. The United States won the tournament, the country's third AmeriCup championship.

Qualification 
Eight teams qualified during the qualification tournaments held in their respective zones in 1997; two teams (USA and Canada) qualified automatically since they are the only members of the North America zone.
 North America: , 
 Caribbean and Central America:, 

The draw split the tournament into two groups:

Group A

Group B

Format 
 The top four teams from each group advance to the quarterfinals.
 Results and standings among teams within the same group are carried over.
 The top four teams at the quarterfinals were granted berths in the 1998 FIBA World Championship. Since the United States were already qualified as Olympic Champions, should they reach one of the top four places in the quarterfinals, the fifth team on the final standings was given the remaining berth.
 The top four teams then played an extra match to define the first six places in the final standings (1 vs. 2 for first place, 3 vs. 4 for third place and 5 vs. 6 for fifth place).

Squads

Preliminary round

Group A 

|}

Group B 

|}

Quarterfinal group 

The top four teams in both Group A and Group B advanced to the quarterfinal group. Then each team played the four from the other group once to complete a full round robin. Records from the preliminary groups carried over. The top two teams advanced to the first place game and the third and fourth-place teams advanced to the third place game. The fifth-place team (Cuba) and the sixth-place team (Canada) did not continue competing for the Americas Championship, but played a further game against each other, with the winner qualifying for the 1998 FIBA World Championship.

|}

Final round

Fifth place game

Third place game

First place game

Awards

Final standings

External links 
 
 1997 Championship of the Americas for Men, FIBA.com.

FIBA AmeriCup
1997 in Uruguayan sport
International basketball competitions hosted by Puerto Rico
1997–98 in North American basketball
1997–98 in South American basketball